William Francis Patterson Quash (27 December 1868 in Barking, London – 17 May 1938 in Barking, London) was an English football player who competed in the 1900 Olympic Games for Great Britain. In Paris he won a gold medal as a member of Upton Park club team.

References

External links

1868 births
1938 deaths
English footballers
English Olympic medallists
Olympic gold medallists for Great Britain
Olympic footballers of Great Britain
Footballers at the 1900 Summer Olympics
Upton Park F.C. players
Olympic medalists in football
Medalists at the 1900 Summer Olympics
Association football midfielders
Footballers from Barking, London